Michel Johann Théato (22 March 1878 – 2 April 1923) was a Luxembourgish long-distance runner, and the winner of the marathon at the 1900 Olympics in Paris for France. He was born in Luxembourg City, Luxembourg and died in Paris, France.

Early life
Little is known about Théato's early life. For many years it was believed he was a baker's delivery boy in Paris. He also worked for some time as a cabinetmaker. In the 20th century, Alain Bouillé discovered that Théato was born in Luxembourg and had moved to Belgium before settling down in the Paris suburbs. There is no evidence that Théato ever applied for French citizenship.  Théato was a member of the athletics club in Saint-Mandé in Paris.

1900 Olympics
The marathon started at 2:30pm in blazing heat. There were only 13 starters of the race, of whom 6 finished. Théato won the race with a time of 2:59:45.

Théato's victory was initially disputed, as several of his opponents, including American runner Arthur Newton, who finished fifth, alleged that Théato had cheated by taking multiple shortcuts, helped by his local knowledge of the Parisian streets through his job as a delivery boy. 
These allegations have since been disproved, but as a result of them, Théato did not receive the gold medal until 1912.

Later life
Théato later became a professional runner, although with relatively little success. He set a personal best in the marathon of 2:42 in 1901.

The Grand Duchy of Luxembourg lodged an official complaint with the International Olympic Committee and petitioned to change the Olympic record of Théato's nationality; the complaint was officially rejected in 2004. In 2021, the IOC site mistakenly displayed the Luxembourg flag on Michel Théato's page, which led some to believe that Luxembourg had officially recovered this Olympic title. It was actually a technical error in the IOC database, error since corrected, between nationality and NOC represented by the athlete.

References

External links

1878 births
1923 deaths
Sportspeople from Luxembourg City
Luxembourgian male long-distance runners
French male marathon runners
Olympic gold medalists for France
Athletes (track and field) at the 1900 Summer Olympics
Medalists at the 1900 Summer Olympics
Luxembourgian male marathon runners
Olympic gold medalists in athletics (track and field)
Luxembourgian expatriate sportspeople in France